is a 1984 Japanese film directed by Makoto Wada. The film is based on a autobiographical novel by Takehiro Irokawa.

Awards and nominations
6th Yokohama Film Festival
 Won: Best Film
 Won: Best Actor - Takeshi Kaga
 Won: Best Supporting Actor - Kaku Takashina

References

1984 films
1980s Japanese-language films
1980s Japanese films

ja:麻雀放浪記#映画 麻雀放浪記